The Hatfield House is a historic house in Fairmount Park, Philadelphia, Pennsylvania.

History

It was built as a suburban villa in 1760, in what is now the Nicetown neighborhood of the city. It operated as Catherine Mallon's Boarding School for Girls from 1806 to 1824. William J. Hay was the next owner, and made major Greek Revival-style alterations – including the addition of the unusual 5-column temple portico – in 1838. Dr. Nathan L. Hatfield, of the University of Pennsylvania, bought it in 1854; his family owned it for 75 years.

The house appears on the 1843 Ellet Map of Philadelphia County, on the south side of Nicetown Road (Hunting Park Avenue), east of the Philadelphia and Germantown Rail Road and west of the Germantown and Perkiomen Turnpike (Germantown Avenue). By the 1855 Barnes Map, the city's street grid has been sketched in, although few of the streets yet existed. By 1862, a horse-drawn streetcar line passed a block east of the house.

Simon Gratz High School was built directly east of the house in 1925. Major Henry Reed Hatfield donated the house to Fairmount Park Commission in 1929. In 1930, the building was dismantled and moved one story at a time to its present site, 33rd Street and Girard Avenue. Architect Erling H. Pedersen, of the Philadelphia Museum of Art, managed the relocation.

It was added to the National Register of Historic Places on March 16, 1972.

See also
 List of houses in Fairmount Park
 National Register of Historic Places listings in North Philadelphia

References

External links

Houses on the National Register of Historic Places in Philadelphia
Colonial Revival architecture in Pennsylvania
Houses completed in 1760
Relocated buildings and structures in Pennsylvania
Houses in Fairmount Park
Philadelphia Register of Historic Places
Greek Revival architecture in Pennsylvania
Historic American Buildings Survey in Philadelphia
East Fairmount Park